Solute carrier family 66 member 3 is a gene in humans that encodes the protein SLC66A3. The function of the SLC66A3 protein is not yet well understood but belongs to a family of five evolutionarily related proteins, the SLC66 lysosomal amino acid transporters. SLC66A3 is localized to the endoplasmic reticulum and has four transmembrane domains.

Gene 
The SLC66A3 is a gene consisting of 26,831 base pairs spanning from 11,155,467-11,178,856 on chromosome 2. SLC66A3 mapped to the plus strand at 2p25.1 and contains 7 exons. The SLC66A3 gene is neighbored by the genes ROCK2, C2orf50, and KCNF1. ROCK2 and C2orf50 are both located upstream of SLC66A3 whereas KCNF1 is located upstream.

Transcripts 
SLC66A3 has 14 different mRNAs, there are 12 alternatively-spliced mRNAs that produce functional proteins and 2 unspliced variations that do not. The longest transcript is transcript variant 1 which produces the longest protein at 202 amino acids in length.

Protein 
The SLC66A3 protein coding gene that produces a protein with the same name. The mRNA transcript variant 1 is 1,717 bp with 7 exons and produces the longest protein, transcript variant 1. SLC66A3 is a 202 amino acid, 22.6 kDa protein with a theoretical isoelectric point of 9.14.

Secondary structure 
The secondary structure of SLC66A3 is predicted to consist of 7 α-helices. The protein contains a signal peptide, 4 transmembrane regions, and a splicing variant region, and is localized in the endoplasmic reticulum.

Tertiary structure 
I-TASSER predicts that the tertiary structure contains 7 coils with high certainty. DiANNA predicts disulfide bonds between positions 9 - 57, 17 - 121, and 82 - 157.

Gene level regulation

Promoter 
The promoter of SLC66A3 is 1,169 base pairs long and is located 1000 base pairs upstream of the 5' UTR.

Transcription factors 
Many different transcription factors regulate the expression of the SLC66A3 gene. Some of these include RNA polymerase II transcription factor II B, Myc associated zinc fingers, EGR/nerve growth factor induced protein C & related factors, and EVI1-myeloid transforming protein.

Expression patterns 
SLC66A3 is expressed at high levels in a variety of tissues throughout the body but is most highly abundant in the whole blood and white blood cells. SLC66A3 is expressed at high levels, approximately 2.1 times more than the average gene.

Protein Level Regulation

Post translational modifications 
SLC66A3 is predicted to undergo phosphorylation, N-glycosylation, and myristoylation.

Homology/Evolution

Orthologs 
SLC66A3 was present in the common ancestor of animals and is found in all animals but not fungi.

References 

Genes on human chromosome 2